Terrimonas soli is a Gram-negative, aerobic, rod-shaped and non-motile  bacterium from the genus of Terrimonas which has been isolated from farmland soil from Chuzhou in China.

References

Chitinophagia
Bacteria described in 2018